John Jerome Hill (October 27, 1918 – June 13, 1986) was an American machinist and politician.

Hill was born in Aurora, Illinois. He graduated from Marmion Academy and went to St. Ambrose University. Hill served in the United States Army during World War II. Hill was a machinist, who worked in a factory in Aurora, and was involved with the United Steel Worker union. Hill served on the Aurora City Council and was a Democrat. He served in the Illinois House of Representatives from 1959 until 1977. Hill then served as Mayor of Aurora from 1977 until 1985. Hill died at his home in Aurora, Illinois.

Notes

1918 births
1986 deaths
People from Aurora, Illinois
Military personnel from Illinois
St. Ambrose University alumni
Machinists
Illinois city council members
Mayors of places in Illinois
Democratic Party members of the Illinois House of Representatives
20th-century American politicians